Thamizh is a 2002 Indian Tamil-language action drama film written and directed by Hari, in his directorial debut and produced by Amudha Durairaj.  The movie stars Prashanth and Simran, while Vadivelu, Urvashi, Nassar, Ashish Vidyarthi and Livingston portray supporting roles. Featuring music composed by Bharadwaj, the film opened to positive reviews upon release in 14 April 2002 and became a commercial success. The film was remade in Bengali as Aakrosh.

Plot
Thamizh leads a happy life with his mother and sister-in-law Kalaichelvi. Thamizh's brother Anbazhagan is working in Kuwait, and he too dreams of joining him there. Meenakshi, their tenant, and Thamizh fall in love. When the goons of Periyavar injure Thamizh's niece, he stops Periyavar's car on the road and questions him. He then beats up one of Periyavar's goons when insulted. This makes him Periyavar's target, and though he tries to withdraw from the violence, he is forced to join forces with Rathnam, Periyavar's sworn enemy, and eventually defeats him.

Cast

Production
The film marked the debut of director Hari, who earlier worked as an assistant director to K. Balachander, while Prashanth agreed to work in the film in early 2001. The film's title of Thamizh was given by Tamil Nadu Chief Minister M. Karunanidhi, who also helped create the film's logo for Deivanai Movies. Simran was selected as heroine pairing with Prashanth, for fourth time after successful collaborations in Kannedhirey Thondrinal (1998), Jodi (1999) and Parthen Rasithen (2000). Actress Mamta Kulkarni was also attached to the project, but eventually did not feature. Director Saran assisted Hari with the dialogues in the film, supervising his writing. The team had worked on pre-production for close to a year and the script was ready prior to the start of the shoot, with Hari revealing he was inspired by the 1989 Malayalam film Kireedam. For his role, Prashanth worked out at the gym, grew a beard and began smoking cigarettes to get into character. Shooting commenced in Chennai and proceeded in locations like Mumbai, Kolkata and Delhi. Scenes were also shot in Sikkim, reportedly becoming the first time that a Tamil film is shot there. A few scenes were also later picturised on Prashanth, Charlie, Vadivelu, and Crane Manohar in Karaikudi. Prashanth had performed a lengthy dialogue in front of Madurai Meenakshi Temple which gained accolades from the onlookers. Prashanth shot action scenes for the film through pain after he had injured his knee during the making of Majunu (2001).

Release
The similarities of title and release date between Thamizh and Vijay-starrer Thamizhan created confusion with the producers of both films unable to accommodate any changes. Made at a cost of 20 million, the film failed to get a distributor before release due to competition from other films, so producer Amudha Durairaj marketed the venture herself. The film was released on Tamil New Year 2002 (14 April) alongside Vijay's Thamizhan, Vikram's Gemini and Vijayakanth's Raajjiyam.

Critical reception
The film gained positive reviews upon release, with a critic noting the "debutant director has woven an action packed entertainer and has etched out the roles well". Another critic wrote "When one leaves the theatre, one gets the satisfaction of watching a good film. This feeling has been rare in recent lives. Thamizh has turned out as the thirst quencher". Malathi Rangarajan of The Hindu noted "Thamizh is backed by a strong storyline and a significant end [sic] and the positive twist is appealing."

Box office
The film became a box office success despite opening with little publicity, with positive word of mouth significantly helping the film's prospects. The film's success established Hari as a popular director in Tamil cinema.

Soundtrack

The film score and the soundtrack were composed by Bharadwaj in his first collaboration with director Hari. The soundtrack, released in 2002, features 7 tracks.

References

External links
 

2002 films
Indian gangster films
Films shot in Madurai
Films set in Tamil Nadu
Films shot in Sikkim
Films shot in Chennai
Films shot in Delhi
Films shot in Kolkata
Films shot in Mumbai
Films directed by Hari (director)
2000s Tamil-language films
Films scored by Bharadwaj (composer)
2002 directorial debut films